Martin Baxter was an Irish Anglican priest.

Baxter was born in County Meath and educated at Trinity College, Dublin. He was Dean of Connor from 1704 to 1709.

References

Alumni of Trinity College Dublin
Deans of Connor
18th-century Irish Anglican priests
People from County Meath